Grand Hustle Presents: In da Streetz Volume 4 is a hip hop compilation album by recording artists of American record label Grand Hustle, founded by rapper T.I. The album was released on December 19, 2006, under Grand Hustle and Atlantic Records.

The album features contributions from several Grand Hustle recording artists, including Big Kuntry King, P$C, Young Dro, Governor, Rashad Morgan and Xtaci, as well as guest appearances from southern rappers B.G., Young Jeezy and Yung Joc. The album's production was mainly handled by Grand Hustle in-house producers such as Khao, Lil' C and Keith Mack, with contributions also coming from high-profile producers Mannie Fresh, Scott Storch, Cyber Sapp and Nitti.

The Grand Hustle compilation album, which is the first of the In da Streets series to be officially released to music retailers (as the previous three installments were only mixtapes), produced two singles. The first single released was "Tell 'Em What They Wanna Hear", a song by American singer-songwriter and record producer Rashad Morgan, featuring T.I. and Young Dro. The compilation's second single is the remix to T.I.'s King album cut, "Top Back". The song, produced by Mannie Fresh, features T.I. rapping alongside Young Jeezy, Young Dro, B.G. and Big Kuntry King.

Track listing

References

2006 compilation albums
Grand Hustle Records compilation albums
Southern hip hop compilation albums
Record label compilation albums
Albums produced by Mannie Fresh
Albums produced by Scott Storch
Albums produced by Lil' C (record producer)
Gangsta rap compilation albums
Trap music albums